Puiggari is a small town in the Diamante department of Entre Ríos province in Argentina. There is an Adventist university as well as an Adventist fitness center with programs to help stop addiction to smoking.
1898 – A hope is born. An Adventist group of pioneers, led by Pastor Francisco Westphal, gave rise to Colegio adventista del Plata (Del Plata Adventist College). There were six students and the first courses they offered were: Nursing and theology.

References

External links

Populated places in Entre Ríos Province
Cities in Argentina
Entre Ríos Province
Argentina